Glauke (minor planet designation: 288 Glauke) is a stony, tumbling asteroid and slow rotator from the intermediate asteroid belt, approximately 32 kilometers in diameter. It was discovered on 20 February 1890, by Robert Luther at Düsseldorf-Bilk Observatory in Germany. It was the last of his asteroid discoveries. It is named after Creusa (known as Glauce or Glauke), a daughter of Creon a king of Corinth in Greek mythology.

Glauke has an exceptionally slow rotation period of about 1200 hours (50 days). This makes it one of the slowest-rotating asteroids in the Solar System. The rotation is believed to be "tumbling", similar to the near-Earth asteroid 4179 Toutatis.

It is a common, stony S-type asteroid in both the Tholen and SMASS classification.

References

External links 
 
 

Background asteroids
Glauke
Glauke
Slow rotating minor planets
S-type asteroids (Tholen)
S-type asteroids (SMASS)
18900220